Kristyn E. Jones currently serves as the Assistant Secretary of the Air Force (Financial Management & Comptroller).

Early life and education 
Jones was raised in Mission Viejo, California and graduated from the United States Military Academy in 1993. She commissioned in the military intelligence branch. After graduating, Jones served in the Army for five years in Germany and Virginia. After leaving the Army in 1998, Jones earned an MBA from George Mason University.

Career 

Jones spent 13 years at the Defense Department finance professional working with the Department of the Navy, Business Transformation Agency, and the Department of the Army. Her last role as a civil servant was serving as the Deputy Assistant Secretary of the Army for 
Financial Information Management until August 2014.

Jones transitioned to the private sector joining KPMG after leaving government. At KPMG she was the managing director of the federal advisory practice.

On January 10, 2022, President Biden nominated Jones to be the Assistant Secretary of the Air Force (Financial Management & Comptroller). She was subsequently confirmed on April 28 and sworn in on May 4.

References 

United States Military Academy alumni
Biden administration personnel
Year of birth missing (living people)
Living people